The Territory of Missouri was an organized incorporated territory of the United States that existed from June 4, 1812, until August 10, 1821.  In 1819, the Territory of Arkansas was created from a portion of its southern area. In 1821, a southeastern portion of the territory was admitted to the Union as the State of Missouri, and the rest became unorganized territory for several years.

History
The Missouri Territory was originally known as the Louisiana Territory and was renamed by the U.S. Congress on June 4, 1812, to avoid confusion with the new state of Louisiana, which had been admitted to the Union on April 30, 1812.

On October 1, 1812, Governor Clark organized the five administrative districts of the former Louisiana Territory into counties, which later became the first five counties of the state of Missouri.

The Anglo-American Convention of 1818 established the northern boundary of the Missouri Territory with the British territory of Rupert's Land at the 49th parallel north. This gave the Missouri Territory the Red River Valley south of the 49th parallel and gave Rupert's Land the slice of Missouri River Valley north of 49th parallel. The Adams–Onís Treaty of 1819 established the southern and western boundaries of the territory with the Spanish territories of Tejas and Santa Fe de Nuevo México. The United States surrendered a significant portion of the Missouri Territory to Spain in exchange for Spanish Florida. The Convention of 1818 and the Adams–Onís Treaty would be the last significant losses of United States territory from the contiguous United States, although the cession of lands north of the 49th parallel would turn out to be the only permanent cession of U.S. territory (the territories ceded to Spain would be re-taken by the U.S. following the Texas annexation and the Mexican–American War).

On March 2, 1819, all of the Missouri Territory south of the parallel 36°30' north, except the Missouri Bootheel between the Mississippi River and the Saint Francis River north of the 36th parallel north, was designated the new Territory of Arkansaw. (The spelling of Arkansaw would be changed a few years later, although the proper pronunciation of the name would be debated until 1881.) The southeastern portion of the Missouri Territory was admitted to the Union as the State of Missouri on August 10, 1821.

St. Louis was the capital of the Missouri Territory.

The remaining portion of the territory, consisting of the present states of Iowa, Nebraska, and the Dakotas, most of Kansas, Wyoming, and Montana, and parts of Colorado, Minnesota and New Mexico, effectively became an unorganized territory after Missouri became a state. In 1834, the portion east of the Missouri River was attached to the Michigan Territory. Over time, various territories were created in whole or in part from its remaining area: Iowa (1838), Minnesota (1849), Kansas and Nebraska (both 1854), Colorado and Dakota (both 1861), Idaho (1863), Montana (1864), and Wyoming (1868).

In the 1820 United States census, 15 counties in the Missouri Territory reported the following population counts:

See also 
 Historic regions of the United States
 History of Missouri
 Territorial evolution of the United States

References

External links
 Peter J. Kastor, Making Missouri American: A crowded frontier in the age of Lewis and Clark

 
States and territories established in 1812
States and territories disestablished in 1821
12th United States Congress
Former organized territories of the United States
Great Plains
Midwestern United States

Pre-statehood history of Arkansas
Pre-statehood history of Idaho
Pre-statehood history of Iowa
Pre-statehood history of Kansas
Pre-statehood history of Missouri
Pre-statehood history of Montana
Pre-statehood history of Nebraska
Pre-statehood history of North Dakota
Pre-statehood history of Oklahoma
Pre-statehood history of South Dakota
Pre-statehood history of Wyoming